China Film Director's Guild Awards (中国导演协会年度表彰大会) are presented by China Film Director's Guild annually to honor excellence in cinema of China.

Major award winners

Other awards

Box Office Director of the Year

Lifetime Achievement award

Special Jury award

Special Contribution award

Outstanding Contribution for Director

Outstanding Directorial Debut

References

External links
 China Film Director's Guild Awards on Internet Movie Database

Chinese film awards
Annual events in China